So You Want to Be in Pictures is a 1947 one-reel short film in the Joe McDoakes series. It was written and directed by Richard L. Bare.

Cast

Main
 George O'Hanlon as Joe McDoakes
 Art Gilmore as narrator

Cameo appearance/Uncredited
 Jack Carson as man Giving Directions
 George Chandler as Sammy
 Clyde Cook as Actor in Army Scene
 Bess Flowers as Woman with Sunglasses
 Jane Harker as Alice McDoakes
 Robert Hutton as himself
 Wayne Morris as himself
 Janis Paige as herself
 Ronald Reagan as himself
 Ralph Sanford as Anthony Anguish
 Alexis Smith as herself
 Martha Vickers as herself

References

External links 

1947 films
American black-and-white films
1947 comedy films
Warner Bros. short films
1947 short films
American comedy short films
1940s English-language films
1940s American films